District School No. 19 is a historic one-room school building located at Hounsfield in Jefferson County, New York. It is a one-story, rectangular one room structure built about 1837 of rubble Chaumont limestone.  It was last used as a school in 1938.

It was listed on the National Register of Historic Places in 1989.

References

One-room schoolhouses in New York (state)
Schoolhouses in the United States
School buildings on the National Register of Historic Places in New York (state)
Buildings and structures in Jefferson County, New York
National Register of Historic Places in Jefferson County, New York